The David Livingstone Centenary Medal was established in March 1913 by the Hispanic Society of America. The establishment commemorates the 100th anniversary of David Livingstone’s birth. Designed by Gutzon Borglum, this medal is awarded by the American Geographical Society for "scientific achievements in the field of geography of the Southern Hemisphere".

History
Livingstone led the Zambezi Expedition from 1858 to 1864. He returned to Africa in 1868, to Zanzibar, where he discovered Lake Victoria and the Lualaba River.

Recipients
The following people received the award in the year specified: 

 1916: Sir Douglas Mawson
 1917: Manuel Vicente Ballivian, Theodore Roosevelt
 1918: Candido Rondon
 1920: William Speirs Bruce, Alexander Hamilton Rice
 1923: Griffith Taylor
 1924: Frank Wild
 1925: Luis Riso Patron
 1926: Erich von Drygalski
 1929: Richard Evelyn Byrd
 1930: Laurence M. Gould, Jose M. Sobral
 1931: Hjalmar Riiser-Larsen
 1935: Lars Christensen
 1936: Lincoln Ellsworth
 1939: John R. Rymill
 1945: Isaiah Bowman
 1948: Frank Debenham
 1950: Robert L. Pendleton
 1952: Carlos Delgado de Carvalho
 1956: George McCutchen McBride
 1958: Paul Allman Siple
 1960: William E. Rudolph
 1965: Bassett Maguire
 1966: Preston E. James
 1968: William H. Phelps, Jr.
 1972: Akin L. Mabogunje
 1985: James J. Parsons
 1987: Calvin J. Heusser
 1988: Jane M. Soons
 2001: Bertha Becker
 2018: Susanna Hecht

See also

 List of geography awards

References

Further reading

External links
 Official website

Awards of the American Geographical Society
Awards established in 1913
1913 establishments in the United States
David Livingstone